Khour II (Chechen: Эла Хоур/Ховра II, Russian: Каир-мек, Persian: Gayur-Khan) was a Chechen king that ruled the Simsir Princedom in the 14th century. He was named after Great Grandfather Khour I, which trasnlates to "Wise" or "Knowing" in the Chechen language. Khour was born into the powerful Sado-Orsoy clan that historically ruled Chechen, Ingush and Alan lands. During the 14th century, the very same clan managed to establish an independent Vainakh kingdom by the name Simsim (also referred to as "Shemu") that prospered until the invasion of Timur.

Family line 
Khasi I
Khour I
Chakhig
Khasi II
Khour II
Makhama
Surakat
Bayr
Sarka

Background and historical references 
The earliest Historical reference to Khour comes in the form of a biography about Timur called Zafarnama from the 15th century. The biography was commissioned during the reign of Ibrahim Sultan, the grandson of Timur. The Zafarname has two versions from two different Persian authors named Nizam ad-Din Shami and Sharaf ad-Din Ali Yazdi. Both biographies speak of the campaigns of Timur in the Caucasus. It is here where Simsim and its leader Gayur-Khan are first mentioned. Local Caucasian folklore, such as the 19th century Ossetian poem "Alguziani" and Chechen Chronicle "Migration from Naxchuvan", also mentions Khour II. He is also mentioned in the 18th century book "Russian History" as "Kair-Mek" alongside an Ossetian prince called Altanzibek. 

These historical sources, coupled with local folk tales, present Khour II as an important figure in the North Caucasus during the 14th century. His ancestry and genealogy was studied by the Sadoy clan historian Murtazaliev, who did fieldwork in Chechnya during 1991-1999 by interviewing several Sadoy clan elders. Their genealogy of famous folk heroes from clan Sadoy contributed a lot to the Chechen historical sciences. The father of Khour was called Khasi II who was the previous (disputed) ruler, while the son of Khour was a Muslim and vassal of Timur named Makhama who is mentioned in the Zafarnama as "Muhammad". The Chechen-Arabic manuscript "Migration from Naxchuvan" from 1820 also gives insight into the family and religion of Khour II. It mentions two brothers called "Kagar" (Kahir) and "Surak-khan" who were both Christians, and the manuscript that is pro-Imamate describes the reach of these two brothers. Kagar ruled lands in Chir-Yurt while his brother Surak extended his rule over Avaria. This manuscript has been understood to have described two important Chechen-Dagestani figures such as Kagar (Khour) and Surak (Surakat), who was the founder of the Avar Nutsaldom. The Dagestani chronicle "Tarikh Dagestan" also notes that the founder of Avar Nutsaldom is a certain Surakat that is descended from the "Urus Sultans".

Early statehood of Simsim 

Khour-Ela is believed to have been an ally of Khan Khidir. This is noted by the historian A. Tesaev who refers to the 18th century book "History of Russia" that relates an event during Khan Khidir's rule. The event in question was the 1360 Kostroma pogrom, where a mob of Christian Russians robbed and killed several Muslim Tatars. The Tatars in return did the same in the Volga region. To quell this violence, the Khan sent three Caucasian ambassadors to negotiate a peace with the Russians. These three ambassadors were called Urus, Altanzibek and Kair-Mek. The last two Ambassadors are noted for their similarity in name with the Ossetian prince Altanzibek and Chechen Prince Khour II. The use of Caucasian Christian ambassadors to Russia was not an uncommon thing to do by the Khan of the Golden Horde, as it happened in a similar situation in 1327 as well.

Chechen folk tales also report that Khour convened with the Mehk-Khel (National Council) and after successfully completing the tasks given to him by the Siyr's (elders), he was elected as the leader of the whole Chechen nation. The folktales about Khour are recorded far and wide in Chechnya, so much so that he is considered as the main leader of the Chechens in the late 14th century by modern historians. It is also due to this fact that Khour is connected with an 18th century manuscript by Russian-Tatar general Sultan Kazi-Girey about a certain "Lamkerist" war with a certain "Mamai". The historian A. Tesaev notes that the manuscript coincides with events in the 14th century during the "Great Troubles" of the Golden Horde when the rogue warlord Mamai fought in several wars during this period. The 18th century manuscript by Kazi-Girey goes into detail about how a force of "Lamkerist" (Mountain Christians in Chechen) went to a certain fortress called "Tatar-Tup" and defeated Mamai without taking the fortress. Later it described how the same army goes and defeats Nogay and Oirat garrisons in the area near the Kuma river. The folktale gives us a date of the event as 1361-1362. This date is also accepted by the Russian historian V. Kuznetsov, who notes that the attack showed the weakening of the Golden Horde in the North Caucasus. It is therefore that the date 1362 is considered important by A. Tesaev, as it marks the establishment of the Simsim Princedom as archaeological research shows that Golden Horde minted coins ceased to exist on the territory of Chechnya after 1362 (after Khan Khidir's reign) and only resurfaced during the reign of Khan Tokhtamysh (an ally of Khour). Khour's reconquest of the plane also marks the birth of other North Caucasian States, led by Nakh rulers, such as the Kingdom of Buriberd or the Kingdom of Pulad.  Another important factor to note was the Georgian Kingdom, which supported Khour in his campaigns according to the folklore and Georgian reports from the reign of George V the Brilliant.

Timurid invasion and fate of Khour 
 
The 18th century document from Kazi-Girey also mentions that Chechens were the main allies (in the vanguard) of the Tokhtamysh army against the Timurid invasions in the Caucasus. It was due to this fact that Timur invaded the Princedom of Simsim with such ferocity after the Battle of the Terek River in 1395. The invasion of Simsir is described in Zafarnama by both Nizam ad-Din Shami and Sharaf ad-Din Ali Yazdi. During the invasion, Khour loses his power and Timur grants the title of vassalage to his son Muhammad (Makhama). Timur's campaign in Simsir went even further into the mountains where Timur himself is described to have climbed the mountains and defeated the highlanders of Simsir. The fate of Khour and his son is unknown in historical references but folk tales speak of an assassination of Makhama. They also mention how Khour kept a resistance against vassals of Timur and eventually fought in another invasion of Timur where he was treacherously murdered during the negotiations. Khour I was eventually succeeded by his brother Surakat, who saved the Princedom from it's collapse, and, after allying with the Kingdom of Georgia, pushed the Timurids out of Simsim.

See also 

 Princedom of Simsim
 Surakat
 Khour I
 Mongol invasions of Durdzuketi
 Timurid invasions of Simsir

References 

Chechen people
Chechen politicians